The Territorial Force War Medal was a campaign medal awarded to members of the British Territorial Force and Territorial Force Nursing Service who served overseas in World War I. It is the rarest of the five British Great War medals.

Award Criteria 
The medal was established in April 1920 for award to members of the Territorial Force and Territorial Force Nursing Service who volunteered for service overseas on or before 30 September 1914, and served overseas. They had to:
 have been serving with the Force on 4 August 1914; or
 have completed four years service with the Force before 4 August 1914 and rejoined on or before 30 September 1914.

In addition provided they:
 undertook, either verbally or by written agreement on or before 30 September 1914 to serve outside the United Kingdom, such agreement being operative after 4 August 1914, and
 have served outside the United Kingdom between 5 August 1914 and 11 November 1918 (both dates inclusive; the last date was in 1918 though the years on the reverse said 1914-19) and
 did not qualify for the 1914 Star or 1914-15 Star.

A total of 33,944 Territorial Force War Medals were awarded. This includes 227 to nurses of the Territorial Force Nursing Service, the only women to receive the medal. The numbers given to each regiment varied widely. For example, 63 were awarded to Seaforth Highlanders, where all three Territorial Force battalions were in France by 1915, compared with 824 to the East Surrey Regiment, where both Territorial battalions undertook garrison duty in India until 1917, and therefore did not qualify for the 1914 or 1914-15 Star.

Description 
 The medal is a circular, bronze and of 36mm (1.42 in) diameter, with a straight bar suspender, with the following design: 
 Obverse: a King George V bareheaded effigy, facing left, with the legend: 'GEORGIVS V BRITT : OMN : REX ET IND : IMP :' ;
 Reverse: a wreath with in centre 'FOR / VOLUNTARY / SERVICE / OVERSEAS / 1914-19', and around the upper outer edge  'TERRITORIAL WAR MEDAL';
 Ribbon: yellow with two green stripes, 32 mm (1.25 in) wide;
 Naming: The number, rank name and unit of the recipient were impressed on the rim in block capitals.

Order of wear
The order of wear of medals awarded for service during the First World War is as follows:
 1914 Star.
 1914–15 Star.
 British War Medal.
 Mercantile Marine War Medal.
 Victory Medal.
 Territorial Force War Medal.

See also 
 British campaign medals
 Lists of abbreviations used on Commonwealth World War I medals
 Territorial Force Imperial Service Badge

References

Bibliography

External links 
 Northeast Medals website (with image)
 Worcestershire medal Service Ltd. website (with image)
 Search over 5 million campaign medal cards on The UK National Archives' website.

British campaign medals
Military awards and decorations of World War I
Awards established in 1920
Army Reserve (United Kingdom)
Nursing awards